MAISD may refer to

Muskegon Area Intermediate School District
Master of Arts in International Studies and Diplomacy